Ben Ezra or Benezra may refer to:

People
Adam Ben Ezra (born 1982), Israeli multi-instrumentalist, composer and educator
Isaac ben Ezra, a tenth-century rabbi
Sonia Benezra (born 1960), Canadian TV and radio interviewer, actress and media personality

Places
Ben Ezra Synagogue in Egypt

See also
"Rabbi ben Ezra", a poem by Robert Browning about Abraham ibn Ezra (1092–1167), one of the great poets, mathematicians, and scholars of the 12th century
ibn Ezra (disambiguation), a prominent Jewish family from Spain spanning many centuries